Grift may refer to:

 Confidence trick

Arts and entertainment
 The Grift, a 2008 novel by American author Debra M. Ginsberg
 The Grift, a 2008 American movie starring Sara Downing
 "The Grift", an episode of Mutant X, a Canadian/American science-fiction television series

Places
 Grift (Fossa Eugeniana), a canal in North Rhine-Westphalia, Germany
 Grift (IJssel), a tributary of river IJssel in Gelderland, Netherlands

People
 Evert Grift (1922–2009), Dutch cyclist
 Fanny Van de Grift Osbourne (1840–1914), wife of Robert Louis Stevenson
 Henk van der Grift (born 1935), Dutch speed skater
 William Webster Van de Grift, birth name of Billy B. Van (1870–1950), American entertainer

See also
 "Grift of the Magi", an episode of the American animated television series The Simpsons
 Grifter (disambiguation)